Vaajakoski-Jyskä is a ward of Jyväskylä, Finland. It is located seven kilometres from the city centre on both sides of Vaajavirta river on the Northern end of lake Päijänne and on the Western end of Lake Leppävesi. As of July 2011 the population of Vaajakoski-Jyskä was 14.588. Before 2009 Vaajakoski-Jyskä belonged to Jyväskylän maalaiskunta.

In spoken language the name Vaajakoski is used to describe big parts of Vaajakoski-Jyskä ward.

The Vaajakoski-Jyskä ward is divided into 12 different neighbourhoods.

Population of neighbourhoods of Vaajakoski-Jyskä in 2007

Gallery

References

External links

 Wessmanni, a local Newspaper in Vaajakoski 
 Panda candy factory in Vaajakoski

Neighbourhoods of Jyväskylä

fi:Vaajakoski